Justin Gocke (January 31, 1978 – September 8, 2014) was an American actor.

Justin Gocke was born in Los Angeles, California, the son of Steve and Loren Gocke. As a former child actor, he is known for his role as Brandon Capwell (1987–1993) on the daytime television series Santa Barbara for which he won a Daytime Emmy Award for Outstanding Younger Actor in a Drama Series.
He was also in a movie with Farrah Fawcett in 1984, The Burning Bed, as well as The Witching of Ben Wagner (1990), and My Grandpa is a Vampire (1992).

Gocke died on September 8, 2014. According to the results of the investigator with the Los Angeles Medical Examiner-Coroner's office, Gocke died from a gunshot wound to the head, which was ruled a suicide.

Filmography

References

1978 births
2014 deaths
American male child actors
American male soap opera actors
Place of birth missing
Daytime Emmy Award winners
Daytime Emmy Award for Outstanding Younger Actor in a Drama Series winners